Methaneilie Solo (born 27 July 1955), better known by his stage name Methaneilie Jütakhrie, is an Indian singer and composer who became successful in Nagaland as a musician in the 1980s and 1990s.

Early years
Methaneilie Solo was born on 27 July 1955 to Zajükhrie Solo and Khrienuo Solo of Tsütuonuomia Thinuo (T-Khel) at Kohima village in Nagaland. Solo became hunchbacked at the age of four after a wrestling match with his brother and could study only up to 4th class. However, his parents and friends encouraged him to sing.

Career 
Methaneilie Solo composed his first song in 1973, and recorded his first album in 1984. In 1993, his 12th volume of cassette was released which includes recording in his own Angami dialect (Tenyidie), as well as translations from other tribal languages and Hindi.  He has recorded 250 songs, and has composed 187 songs himself.

A few of his popular Tenyidie songs are:
Kekhrie
Pfütsero
Sievü No
Dzükou
Nagamia Rüli  
Oh Kohima

Whiskey, I Call Her Darling and Nagaland City Kuribole are some of his popular Nagamese songs.

Awards
On 26 October 2021, Solo was awarded the ‘Lifetime Achievement Award’ at the 13th Music Awards of Nagaland held at RCEMPA.

Discography
‘Jütakhrieko’ (1984)

Personal life

Family
Solo married Dziesetuonuo in 1983. Together the couple has two daughters and two sons.

References

External links
 Methaneilie Solo on Instagram
 Methaneilie Solo on YouTube

1955 births
Living people
Indian male singer-songwriters
Indian singer-songwriters
20th-century Indian singers
Musicians from Nagaland
People from Kohima
20th-century Indian male singers